The fourth season of Food Paradise, an American food reality television series narrated by Mason Pettit on the Travel Channel, premiered on November 7, 2012. First-run episodes of the series aired in the United States on the Travel Channel on Mondays at 10:00 p.m. EDT. The season contained 25 episodes and concluded airing on April 24, 2013.

Food Paradise features the best places to find various cuisines at food locations across America. Each episode focuses on a certain type of restaurant, such as "Diners", "Bars", "Drive-Thrus" or "Breakfast" places that people go to find a certain food specialty.

Episodes

Bacon Paradise 2: Another Slab (2012)

Hamburger Paradise 2: The Double-Decker (2012)

Barbecue Paradise 2: Another Rack (2012)

Sausage Paradise (2012)

Pot Pie Paradise (2012)

Chili Paradise (2012)

Food Paradise: Manliest Restaurants 2 (2012)
Note: This episode aired as a special on November 21, 2012.
The list below features the 9 different regional competition finalists of Men's Health Magazine's "2012 Manliest Restaurants in America" competition.
The competitors must fall into one of the nine essential categories: steakhouse, brew pub, burger spot, pizza parlor, sandwich shop, adventurous eating, seafood shack, taco stand and barbecue joint.

Sandwich Paradise 2: The Upper Crust (2012)

Meatloaf Paradise (2012)

Drive Thru Paradise (2012)

Hot Dog Paradise 2: The Missing Links (2013)

Pork Paradise (2013)

Meatball Paradise (2013)

Pizza Paradise 2: Another Slice (2013)

Fried Chicken Paradise (2013)

Soul Food Paradise (2013)

Deli Paradise (2013)

Deep Fried Paradise 3: Grease is the Word (2013)

Cheese Paradise (2013)

Mexican Food Paradise (2013)

Steak Paradise 3: Prime Cuts (2013)

Truck Stop Paradise (2013)

Buffet Paradise (2013)

Seafood Paradise (2013)

Taste Like Chicken Paradise (2013)

Garlic Paradise (2013)

References

External links
Food Paradise @Travelchannel.com

2012 American television seasons
2013 American television seasons
Television shows set in New Braunfels, Texas